Amalia Ulman (born 1989) is an Argentinian artist and film director based in New York City whose practice includes performance, installation, video and net-art works. Her work deals with issues of class, gender, sexuality, and middlebrow aesthetics. In 2021, Ulman made her feature film debut, with El Planeta.

Early life 
Ulman was born in Argentina in 1989 and was raised in Gijón, in the Spanish province of Asturias, after emigrating with her family.

In 2009, she left Spain to study at Central Saint Martins in London, where she graduated in 2011. In 2013, she was in a serious Greyhound bus accident that left her with a permanent disability.

Career
In April 2013, Ulman presented a video essay Buyer, Walker, Rover as a Skype lecture at the Regional State Archives in Gothenburg.

In 2014, she presented two solo shows in LA, CA, Used & New at ltd Los Angeles and Delicious Works at Smart Objects, also in LA. 

The same year Ulman started "Excellences & Perfections", a four-month performance on her Instagram account where she fabricated a fictional characters whose story unfolded in three different episodes. Her intention was to prove how easy an audience can be manipulated through the use of mainstream archetypes. Instagram selfies were mainly taken sneaking into hotels and restaurants in Los Angeles and posted as if they documenting a real life. Excellences and Perfections was later chosen to be a part of the Electronic Superhighway Exhibition at Whitechapel Gallery in 2016.

In October 2014, during Frieze Art Fair, Ulman presented a solo show The Destruction of Experience at Evelyn Yard in London. For the show Ulman made "The Future Ahead", a video essay about Justin Bieber's "growth from angelic teenager to hetero-normative white male".

In January 2015, she presented Stock Images of War, her first solo show in New York City at James Fuentes Gallery. It is an immersive installation composed of twelve simple wire-frame sculptures, each one being after a different month of the year – i.e. "War in January", "War in February", etc. Towards the end of the same year, Ulman started Privilege, a second, year long, Instagram performance that lasted until shortly after the 2016 U.S. presidential election. The work presented an exaggerated version of Ulman that explored multiplicity in a corporate office setting. 

In 2016 "Excellences and Perfections" was selected to be included in the group exhibition Performing for the Camera at Tate Modern, London (18 February — 12 June 2016). The exhibition, examined the relationship between photography and performance, brought together over 500 works spanning 150 years from the invention of photography to the selfie-culture of today. Through Ulman's Instagram-based project, social media was examined in the historical context of photographic performances. The installation was also part of the exhibition Electronic Highway at Whitechapel Gallery in London. Ulman has been described as the first social network-based artist to enter top institutional galleries, and the "First great Instagram Artist" by Elle magazine.

In 2018, Excellences & Perfections was published as a book by Prestel. It includes the Instagram posts that she used for the project and essays by German artist Hito Steyerl, editor Rob Horning and others.

Film

In 2021, Ulman premiered her first feature film, El Planeta, at the Sundance Film Festival to critical acclaim. Ulman wrote, produced, and directed the feature, which stars herself and her mother.  An absurdist comedy, the film centers on the story of a mother and daughter facing eviction in post-crisis Spain and scamming their way to a more comfortable lifestyle. The film is loosely based on the real-life Spanish mother-daughter petty-crime duo Justina and Ana Belén. The film was shot in black and white in Gijon, the Spanish town where Ulman grew up. In March 2021, film distribution company Utopia announced that it had bought the North American rights to El Planeta. The film was selected for screening at the Brisbane International Film Festival and the Sydney Film Festival in October and November 2021 respectively.

Ulman's next film will deal with climate change and will be shot in northern Argentina, where she was born.

Personal life
As of 2021, Ulman lives with her husband in New York City. Ulman is autistic.

Solo exhibitions 

 Savings & Shelves, Headquarters, Zurich
 Overcome, cleanse, Galeria Adriana Suarez, Gijon

 Promise a Future, Marbriers 4, Geneva
 Moist Forever, Future Gallery, Berlin
 Ethira, Arcadia Missa, London

 Used & New, Ltd, Los Angeles
 Delicious Works, Smart Objects, Los Angeles
 Babyfootprints Crow's Feet, Ellis King, Dublin
 The Destruction of Experience, Evelyn Yard Gallery, London

 Stock Images of War, James Fuentes Gallery, New York City
 International House Of Cozy, Showroom MAMA, Rotterdam

 Reputation, New Galerie, Paris
 Labour Dance, Arcadia Missa, London

 Dignity, James Fuentes Gallery, New York City
 Intolerance, Barro, Buenos Aires
 Monday Cartoons, Deborah Schamoni, Munich
 Atchoum!, Galerie Sympa, Figeac
 New World 1717, Rockbund Art Museum, Shanghai

 Privilege, James Fuentes Gallery, New York City

See also 
Aliza Shvarts
Post-Internet art

Notes

References

External links 

 Cadence Kinsey, "The Instagram artist who fooled thousands" on the BBC website.
"Buyer, walker, rover" Skype lecture, Regional State Archives in Gothenburg, 2013
Amalia Ulman's Instagram performance exposed the flaws in selfie culture, CNN

1989 births
Spanish women artists
Spanish women photographers
Living people
Spanish contemporary artists
Digital artists
Women digital artists
Argentine emigrants to Spain
Spanish photographers
Spanish sculptors
Spanish performance artists
Internet art
New media artists
21st-century women photographers